Howard County is one of 92 counties in the U.S. state of Indiana. As of the 2020 census, the population was 83,658. The county seat is Kokomo. Originally named Richardville County, it was renamed in 1844 to commemorate General Tilghman Ashurst Howard.

Howard County comprises the Kokomo, Indiana Metropolitan Statistical Area.

Geography

Adjacent counties
 Miami County, Indiana (North)
 Grant County, Indiana (East)
 Tipton County, Indiana (South)
 Clinton County, Indiana (Southwest)
 Carroll County, Indiana (West)
 Cass County, Indiana (Northwest)

History
This county was organized in 1844. It was first known as Richardville County. Its first name honored Jean Baptiste Richardville, a chief of the Miami. Richardville's name was Pe-che-wa, which translates to “Wildcat”, hence Wildcat Creek.

In 1846, the name was changed to Howard County, in honor of Gen. Tilghman Howard, U.S. Representative from Indiana, who died in 1844.

Notable locations 
 Kokomo Reservoir (Wildcat Creek Reservoir)
 Western Days Festival: First week of June, in Russiaville, Indiana
 Howard County 4-H Fair, in Greentown, Indiana
 Koh-Koh-Mah & Foster Living History Encampment, mid-September
 Kokomo-Howard County Public Library

Communities

City
 Kokomo

Towns
 Greentown
 Russiaville

Former census-designated place
 Indian Heights

Townships
 Center
 Clay
 Ervin
 Harrison
 Honey Creek
 Howard
 Jackson
 Liberty
 Monroe
 Taylor
 Union

Other places
 Alto
 Cassville
 Center
 Hemlock
 New London
 Oakford
 Phlox
 West Middleton

Climate and weather 

Transportation

Airports
 Kokomo Municipal Airport

Highways

Bus services
 City-Line Trolley Serves the city of Kokomo. It is a fixed transportation route that is free to ride and has free wifi.
 Trailways A service running from Indianapolis through Kokomo, and then to South Bend.
 Greyhound Lines A nationwide service, the Kokomo stop is at the Marathon gas station on North Reed Road, and Gano Street.

Walking trails
 Walk Of Excellence – serves the city of Kokomo.
 Industrial Heritage Trail – serves the city of Kokomo.
 Nickel Plate Trail – ends in northern Howard County in unincorporated community, Cassville. Connects directly to Industrial Heritage Trail in Kokomo.
 Cloverleaf Trail - Serves the West side to downtown of the city of Kokomo.
 Comet Trail – serves the town of Greentown, and is exactly one mile in length.
 Historic Downtown Trail – serves the city of Greentown, marked with information about Greentown's history.

Education

Colleges and universities
 Indiana University Kokomo (IUK)
 Indiana Wesleyan University – Kokomo Campus
 Ivy Tech Community College
 Purdue College of Technology

Public school districts
 Kokomo-Center Township Consolidated School Corporation (K–12, Kokomo, Indiana) Kokomo High School (NCC)
 Eastern Howard School Corporation (K–12, Greentown, Indiana) (MIC)
 Northwestern School Corporation (K–12) (MIC)
 Taylor Community School Corporation (K–12, Indian Heights, Indiana) (MIC)
 Western School Corporation (K–12, Russiaville, Indiana) (MIC)

Private schools
 Redeemer Lutheran School (K–8)
 Sts. Joan of Arc and St. Patrick Catholic School (K–8)
 Temple Christian School (K–12)
 Victory Christian Academy (K–12)
 Acacia Academy (K–8)

Government

The county government is a constitutional body, and is granted specific powers by the Constitution of Indiana, and by the Indiana Code.

County Council: The county council is the legislative branch of the county government and controls all the spending and revenue collection in the county. Representatives are elected from county districts. The council members serve four-year terms. They are responsible for setting salaries, the annual budget, and special spending. The council also has limited authority to impose local taxes, in the form of an income and property tax that is subject to state level approval, excise taxes, and service taxes.

Board of Commissioners: The executive body of the county is made of a board of commissioners. The commissioners are elected county-wide, in staggered terms, and each serves a four-year term. One of the commissioners, typically the most senior, serves as president. The commissioners are charged with executing the acts legislated by the council, collecting revenue, and managing the day-to-day functions of the county government.

Court: The county maintains five courts. Circuit Court, Superior Court I, Superior Court II Superior Court III and Superior Court IV. The judge on the court is elected to a term of four years and must be admitted to practice law in the State of Indiana. In some cases, court decisions can be appealed to the Indiana Court of Appeals.

County Officials: The county has several other elected offices, including sheriff, coroner, auditor, treasurer, recorder, surveyor, and circuit court clerk Each of these elected officers serves a term of four years and oversees a different part of county government. Members elected to county government positions are required to declare party affiliations and to be residents of the county.

Howard County is part of Indiana's 2nd congressional district and Indiana's 5th congressional district; Indiana Senate districts 7 and 21; and Indiana House of Representatives districts 30, 32 and 38.

Demographics

As of the 2010 United States Census, there were 82,752 people, 34,301 households, and 22,604 families residing in the county. The racial makeup of the county was 88.6% white, 6.9% black or African American, 0.9% Asian, 0.3% American Indian, 0.8% from other races, and 2.5% from two or more races. Those of Hispanic or Latino origin made up 2.7% of the population. In terms of ancestry, 22.4% were German, 15.3% were American, 10.8% were English, and 10.2% were Irish.

Of the 34,301 households, 30.7% had children under the age of 18 living with them, 48.3% were married couples living together, 13.1% had a female householder with no husband present, 34.1% were non-families, and 29.4% of all households were made up of individuals. The average household size was 2.38 and the average family size was 2.92. The median age was 40.7 years.

The median income for a household in the county was $47,697 and the median income for a family was $55,479. Males had a median income of $50,838 versus $33,196 for females. The per capita income for the county was $23,759. About 13.1% of families and 16.4% of the population were below the poverty line, including 26.9% of those under age 18 and 4.3% of those age 65 or over.

See also
 National Register of Historic Places listings in Howard County, Indiana
 List of counties in Indiana

References

External links
 Howard County Official Website

 
Populated places established in 1844
Indiana counties
Kokomo, Indiana metropolitan area
1844 establishments in Indiana